Månafossen is a waterfall in Gjesdal municipality in Rogaland county, Norway. The waterfall is in a fairly isolated area. There is a parking area nearby with a steep, rough  hiking trail up a mountainside to see the waterfall. The hike takes about 30 minutes.

Gallery

References

External links
 Information provided by the municipality

Waterfalls of Rogaland
Gjesdal